Orthopaedic Nurse, Certified (ONC) is the designation for an orthopaedic nurse who has earned nursing board certification from the Orthopaedic Nurses Certification Board (ONCB)

Job Description 
ONBC helps develop muscle health by administering a certificate to the Orthopaedic nurse that improves their knowledge and improves their practice. An Orthopaedic nurse is responsible for assessing new patients for their conditions, watching the condition of their current patients, and providing treatments and medication. As part of this role, the nurse also monitors vital signs, looks over the surgical sight, changes dressings, and notifies the doctor of any change in the patient's condition. Finally, the Orthopaedic nurse also performs general nursing techniques, such as changing bedpans, assisting the patient with walking, enforcing care plans, providing IV medication, and informing and supporting the patient and their families. The optimal goal for the Orthopaedic nurse is to keep the patient comfortable, which may require turning the patient and providing pain relievers as needed.

Exam and Certification 
The Orthopaedic certification exam contains 150 questions, 135 of which are scored while the other 15 do not affect the test score. 97/135 is needed to pass the exam. Results are hosted by AMP, which is ONCB's test vendor. The ONCB then distributes the results directly to the new certified holder. The ONCB does not distribute the results to individual agencies. The exam is usually given in the Fall and Spring and is offered around the United States. To take the certification exam the nurse has to be licensed and have at least 2 years experience but doesn't need a bachelor's degree. Nurses must have 1000 hours of Orthopaedic patient care within the last 3 years. Certification lasts for 5 years, after which recertification or continuing education is required.

Recertification 
Recertification in Orthopeadic Nursing requires 1000 practice hours logged in an applicant's past 5 years and 100 hours of education: 70 hours in Orthopaedics and 30 hours in general nursing. The application can take 8 weeks to process. Paper applications should be mailed with a return receipt.

Salary 
On average, an Orthopaedic nurse draws a salary of  $69,000 a year.

See also
List of nursing credentials

External links
Orthopaedic Nurses Certification Board website

References

Nursing credentials and certifications
Orthopedics